Oman competed at the 1996 Summer Olympics in Atlanta, United States.

References
Official Olympic Reports

Nations at the 1996 Summer Olympics
1996
1996 in Omani sport